Calceolaria integrifolia, the bush slipperwort, is a shrub belonging to the genus Calceolaria and native to Argentina and Chile.

Calceolaria integrifolia grows to 1.8 meters (6 feet) tall. Its leaves are highly veined, slightly sticky,  and have a puckered texture. The flowers are yellow and grow in clusters. The plant flowers from spring to the autumn.

In cultivation in the UK, it has gained the Royal Horticultural Society's Award of Garden Merit. It requires a sheltered, frost-free position in sun or partial shade.

References

Chilean Calceolarias, in Chileflora, seed provider

integrifolia
Flora of Chile